Everything and Nothing is a non-charting compilation album by David Sylvian

Everything and Nothing may also refer to:

Music

Albums
Everything and Nothing, album by Hammock (band) 2016
Everything and Nothing, album by Chingy
Everything and Nothing Too, album by Amy Allison (2006)
Everything and Nothing Less, live album by Chris McClarney 2015

Songs
"Everything and Nothing", song from Vagabonds (The Classic Crime album)
"Everything and Nothing", song by Vince Gill (with Katrina Elam) from These Days (Vince Gill album)
"Everything and Nothing", song by The Boom Circuits from The Twilight Saga: Breaking Dawn – Part 2 (soundtrack)
"Everything and Nothing", song by Taxiride from Electrophobia 2006
"Everything and Nothing", song by Mudvayne L.D. 50 (album) and Kill, I Oughtta and from Discography of the Resident Evil film series
"Everything and Nothing", song by A Plea for Purging from A Critique of Mind and Thought 2007 
"Everything and Nothing", song by Sheer Terror from No Grounds for Pity 1996 compilation album
"Everything and Nothing Else", song by Austin Stone Worship from This Glorious Grace
"Everything and Nothing Less", song by Jesus Culture from Let It Echo 2015

Other
Everything & Nothing, science documentary by Jim Al-Khalili
Everything and Nothing: The Dorothy Dandridge Tragedy, on Dorothy Dandridge by Earl Conrad